Samuel Teresi (born 1960) is an American politician. He was the 24th Mayor of the City of Jamestown, New York, serving from 2000 to 2020. Running for the Democratic Party, he defeated incumbent Republican mayor Richard Kimball Jr. to become mayor of Jamestown in 2000. Teresi earned a BA in Political Science, from State University of New York, Buffalo in 1982 and an MA in Public Affairs/Administration from State University of New York, Albany in 1984.

On February 4, 2019, he announced that he would not seek re-election. He was succeeded by Eddie Sundquist.

References

1960 births
Living people
Politicians from Jamestown, New York
New York (state) Democrats
University at Buffalo alumni